The 1982 London Marathon was the second running of the annual marathon race in London, United Kingdom, which took place on Sunday, 9 May. The elite men's race was won by home athlete Hugh Jones in a time of 2:09:24 hours and the women's race was won by Britain's Joyce Smith in 2:29:43. 

Around 90,000 people applied to enter the race, of which 18,059 had their applications accepted and around 16,350 started the race. A total of 15,116 runners finished the race.

Results

Men

Women

References

Results
Results. Association of Road Racing Statisticians. Retrieved 2020-04-24.

External links

Official website

1982
London Marathon
Marathon
London Marathon